Pallett may refer to:

Alyssa Nicole Pallett (born 1985), the former owner of New York vintage store, "The Sweet Ones"
Henry Pallett (1863–1917), English cricketer
John Pallett (1921–1985), Canadian lawyer and politician
Owen Pallett (born 1979), Canadian composer, violinist, keyboardist, and vocalist
Roxanne Pallett (born 1982), British actress, played Jo Sugden in ITV soap opera Emmerdale
Sarah Pallett, New Zealand politician

See also
Paillet
Palette (disambiguation)
Pallet
Pallot (disambiguation)
Pellet (disambiguation)
Pollet